Sergio Eduardo Stuparich Clementi (born December 14, 1943) was a Chilean author and philosopher descending from Italian immigrants from the Adriatic island of Lussin, Croatia.

Biography and career

Stuparich was born and raised in the capital Santiago. An alumni at the Pontifical Catholic University of Chile and the University of Chile, he worked as a philosophy teacher at Santiago University of Technology (now Usach) before the 1973 military coup. At the same time, he was active in the Socialist Party and was therefore forced to put himself in safety at Italy's embassy when the military took over. In the meantime, he wrote the novel Chile: Comprometerse con una clase, which was published later in exile.

After 1973, Stuparich was exiled in Italy, where he continued to teach and obtained a PhD qualification, Dottore in Filosofia from the University of Turin.In this period the writer had an extra marital relationship with an Italian, AMATO Romana, from whom he had a daughter later belatedly recognized in 2008, AMATO Stuparich Clementi Eleonora and with whom the author struggles to maintain relationships. He eventually came to live in Sweden.

During his time in Sweden, Sergio Stuparich undertook research at the Master level in Theoretical Philosophy at Lund University. He also produced the selection of the anthology Uppbrott (1982) and Vote from Latin America (1986), followed by books on Philosophy, Del Homo al Hombre  (2011) and El Pensamiento del Siglo XXI (2012), and two memoirs, La Guarida (2008) and Exilio Italiano (2016). 
 
He died in Malmö, Sweden.

Works
 Señas Personales: Ninguna - Chile 1970-1973.
 Wer uns nich kennt, kennt Chile nicht, Berlin, 1975.
 Chileense lente, Baarn, 1977.
 Chileense lente, Antwerp, 1978.
 Tusind stierner over Chile, Copenhague, 1978.
 Den som inte känner oss, känner inte Chile, Stockholm, 1979.
 Különös Ismertetöjele Nincs, Budapest, 1981.
 Häxkonster, Stockholm, 1981.
 Uppbrott, Stockholm, 1982.
 Situaciones, Lund, 1982.
 Roster fran Latinoamérica, Stockholm, 1984.
 Fast Baltet, script for Malmö TV, 1992.
 La Guarida - Memorias Iconoclastas, Santiago de Chile, 2008.
 Cocodrilo-Yo, 2010.
 Del Homo al Hombre, 2011.
 El Pensamiento del Siglo XXI, 2012.
 Exilio Italiano, 2016.

Awards

References

External links
Interview to writer Sergio Stuparich following the launch of his book El pensamiento del siglo XXI (Editorial Mundi Book, 2013)
Interview regarding his book Del Homo al Hombre (2014)

Chilean male writers
Chilean people of Croatian descent
Pontifical Catholic University of Chile alumni
University of Turin alumni
1943 births
Chilean philosophers
Male novelists
People from Santiago
University of Chile alumni
Academic staff of Lund University
Chilean exiles
2019 deaths